Barringer is a surname. Notable people with the surname include:

 Anthony R. Barringer (1925–2009), Canadian/American geophysicist and inventor
 Daniel Barringer (1860–1929), American geologist best known for proving the Meteor Crater to be an impact crater
 Daniel Laurens Barringer (1788–1832), U.S. Congressman from North Carolina, 1825–1834.
 Daniel Moreau Barringer (1806–1873), U.S. Congressman from North Carolina, 1843–1848.
 Emily Barringer (1876–1961), American and the first female ambulance surgeon and the first woman to secure a surgical residency
 Ethel Barringer (1883–1925), South Australian artist, sister-in-law to Gwen Barringer
 Gwen Barringer (1882–1960) South Australian watercolorist
 Jennifer Simpson, née Barringer, (born 1986), American track and field athlete
 Leslie Barringer (1895–1968), British fantasy author 
 Patricia Barringer (1924–2007),  All-American Girls Professional Baseball League player and manager
 Rufus Barringer (1821–1895), Confederate military general from North Carolina during the American Civil War 
 William H. Barringer (1841–1917), Union hero of the American Civil War
 William N. Barringer, superintendent of Newark Public Schools for whom Barringer High School is named

See also
Barringer Township
Barranger
The Barringer Crater (or The Meteor Crater), located near Flagstaff, Arizona, one of the largest and best-known meteorite craters on Earth
Barringer Farmhouse, an historic structure located in Rhinebeck, New York
Barringer High School, in Newark, New Jersey
Barringer Hill, a geological and mineralogical site in central Texas
 The Barringer Hotel, an historic hotel building located at Charlotte, North Carolina
The Barringer lunar crater, posthumously named after Daniel Barringer
The Barringer Mansion, an historic home located at Charlottesville, Virginia
The Barringer Medal, given annually by the Meteoritical Society for research on impact cratering and allied fields
The Barringer Trophy, awarded for the greatest straight-line distance soaring flight during the previous calendar year